In organic chemistry, the term cyanomethyl (cyanide (N≡C) + methyl (CH3)) designates:

 A cyanomethyl group (N≡CCH2–), a type of nitrile group
 The cyanomethyl radical (N≡CCH2·)
 The cyanomethyl carbanion (N≡CCH2−)

See also
 Ethynyl
 Hydroxymethyl
 Trifluoromethyl

Functional groups
Nitriles
Substituents